The 1999 Washington State Cougars football team represented Washington State University as a member of the Pacific-10 Conference during the 1999 NCAA Division I-A football season. Led by 11th-year head coach Mike Price, the Cougars compiled an overall record of 3–9 with a mark of 1–7 in conference play, placing last out of ten teams in the Pac-10.

Schedule

Roster

Game summaries

Utah

Stanford

Idaho

Arizona

California

References

Washington State
Washington State Cougars football seasons
Washington State Cougars football